The Heavyweight competition at the 2023 IBA Women's World Boxing Championships will be held between 16 and 26 March 2023.

Results

References

External links
Draw

Heavyweight